Khalil Abou Hamad (1936–1992) was a Lebanese lawyer who served as the minister of foreign affairs in the period 1970–1973.

Biography
Abou Hamad was born in 1936. He hailed from a Greek Catholic family. He was a lawyer by profession and founded a law firm in Beirut. He was named as the minister of foreign affairs on 13 October 1970 in the cabinet led by Prime Minister Saeb Salam, replacing Nassim Majdalani in the post. Abou Hamad remained in office until 25 April 1973 when a new cabinet formed, and Khatchig Babikian was appointed as foreign minister. 

When Abou Hamad was in office in December 1970 he announced the neutrality of Lebanon stating that Lebanon would not align with either side in the Cold War. In 1972 Abou Hamad visited China following the opening of National Bank of China in Beirut. 

Abou Hamad was one of the board of trustees members of the Diana Tamari Sabbagh Foundation which was established by Palestinian businessman Hasib Sabbagh in 1979 following the death of his wife Diana Tamari. Abou Hamad died in 1992.

References

External links

20th-century Lebanese lawyers
1936 births
1992 deaths
Foreign ministers of Lebanon
Lebanese corporate directors
Lebanese Roman Catholics